Kenneth A. Loparo is Nord Professor of Engineering and Chair of Department of Electrical Engineering and Computer Science at the Case Western Reserve University, OH, USA, where has been affiliated with since 1979. He was an assistant professor in the Mechanical Engineering Department at Cleveland State University from 1977 to 1979.

Prof. Loparo's research interests include stability and control of nonlinear and stochastic systems with applications to large-scale electricity systems including generation and transmission and distribution; nonlinear filtering with applications to monitoring, fault detection, diagnosis, prognosis and reconfigurable control; information theory aspects of stochastic and quantized systems with applications to adaptive and dual control and the design of distributed autonomous control systems; the development of advanced signal processing and data analytics for monitoring and tracking of physiological behavior in health and disease.

Education 
BSME, Cleveland State University, Fenn College of Engineering

MS, Mechanical Engineering, Cleveland State University, Fenn College of Engineering

PhD, Systems and Control Engineering, Case Western Reserve University

Awards 
He has received numerous awards including the Sigma Xi Research Award for contributions to stochastic control, the John S. Diekoff Award for Distinguished Graduate Teaching, the Tau Beta Pi Outstanding Engineering and Science Professor Award, the Undergraduate Teaching Excellence Award, the Carl F. Wittke Award for Distinguished Undergraduate Teaching and the Srinivasa P. Gutti Memorial Engineering Teaching Award.

Appointments 
Prof. Loparo was associate dean of engineering from 1994 -1997 and chair of the Department of Systems Engineering from 1990 -1994. He served as chair of the Faculty Senate in 1999-2000 and as the president of the Case Alumni Association from 2009-2011. He became chair of EECS in 2013 and Arthur L. Parker Endowed Chair in 2014.

Loparo was designated a fellow of the IEEE in 1999. He has held numerous positions in the IEEE Control System Society including chair of the Program Committee for the 2002 IEEE Conference on Decision and Control, vice chair of the Program Committee for the 2000 IEEE Conference on Decision and Control, chair of the Control System Society Conference (CSS) Audit and Finance Committees, member of the CSS Board of Governors, member of the CSS Conference Editorial Board and Technical Activities Board, associate editor for the IEEE Transactions on Automatic Control and associate editor for the IEEE Control Systems Society Magazine.

References

External links
 Loparo's Personal Homepage
 Complex Systems Biology Center at the Case Western Reserve University
 

Case Western Reserve University people
Case Western Reserve University alumni
Case Western Reserve University faculty
Fellow Members of the IEEE
Living people
Cleveland State University alumni
Year of birth missing (living people)